Bryn Day (24 November 1919 – 26 September 1977) was a Welsh rugby union, and professional rugby league footballer who played in the 1940s and 1950s.

Background
Bryn Day's birth was registered in Bridgend district, Wales, and his death aged 57 was registered in Oldham district, Greater Manchester, England.

Playing career

International honours
Bryn Day won caps for Wales while at Oldham 1952 2-caps.

Club career
Bryn Day made his début for Warrington on 8 February 1947, and he played his last match for Warrington on 30 August 1947.

Genealogical information
Bryn Day's marriage to Muriel G. (née John) (first ¼ 1924 in Cardiff district – second ¼ 1962 (aged 38) in Oldham district) was registered during first ¼ 1947 in Cardiff district. They had children; Brynley J. Day (birth registered during third ¼  in Oldham district). Following his first wife's death in 1962, Bryn Day's marriage to Sheila M. Beblot was registered during second ¼ 1968 in Oldham district.

References

External links
Statistics at orl-heritagetrust.org.uk

1919 births
1977 deaths
Bridgend RFC players
Oldham R.L.F.C. players
Rugby league players from Bridgend
Rugby league locks
Rugby league props
Rugby union players from Bridgend
Wales national rugby league team players
Warrington Wolves players
Welsh rugby league players
Welsh rugby union players